What I Like About You is an American television sitcom co-created by Wil Calhoun and Dan Schneider. It is set mainly in New York City, following the lives of two sisters:  vivacious teenaged sister Holly (Amanda Bynes) and her responsible older sister Val (Jennie Garth). The series ran on The WB from September 20, 2002, to March 24, 2006, with a total of 86 episodes produced. With the exception of a brief period early in the second season, What I Like About You was a headline on The WB's Friday night comedy block.

Cast and characters

Throughout their time on the series, two main characters—Vince and Lauren—were never given last names. Jeff was also never given a last name, although in the artwork for the season 1 DVDs, he is listed as "Jeff Campbell".

Main

Recurring
Dan Cortese as Vic Meladeo (seasons 1 & 4)
Edward Kerr as Rick (seasons 2–4)
David de Lautour as Ben Sheffield (season 3)

Guest
Abigail Breslin
Fran Drescher
Megan Fox 
JoAnna Garcia
Rebecca Gayheart
Tony Hawk
Minka Kelly
Cameron Mathison
Jesse McCartney
Jenny McCarthy
Jason Priestley
JC Chasez
Luke Perry
Ian Ziering
Penn Badgley
Jenna Fischer

Production

Theme song and opening sequences
The series takes its title from the song of the same name, which was originally released on a hit record by The Romantics in 1980; it was written by the group's members Wally Palmar, Mike Skill, Rich Cole, and Jimmy Marinos. A cover version of the song, performed by the Canadian all-female rock group Lillix, was used as the theme song for the show. Lillix's cover version was also heard on the soundtrack of the 2003 remake of Freaky Friday and the soundtrack of the film 13 Going on 30. The theme was remixed into a techno/dance style theme for the second season by Philip Steir (who composed all the music for remainder of the series).

The pilot episode had a short opening sequence and the cast members' names were only shown over the cold open. The first season's opening sequence featured intercut scenes (as from home movies) of two girls portraying younger versions of Holly and Val, with shots of Bynes and Garth sticking their tongues out at the camera, mixed with footage excerpted from the first four episodes. The opening title sequence used for the rest of the series featured the show's cast in front of digitally inserted scenes of New York at night. Different versions of the sequence were used for SD and HD broadcasts.

Due to music costs, and rights, DVD and streaming releases replaced the theme song of Lillix's cover of a song by the same name of the series by The Romantics. Remarking upon it when the series was added to HBO Max in January 2021 with the replacement music, TVLine called it "royalty-free garbage that not even Shazam can identify."

Broadcast

Episodes

Series overview

History 
What I Like About You premiered on Friday, September 20, 2002, in the 8PM timeslot. On September 11, 2003, the series moved to Thursday nights at 9PM, alongside The Jamie Kennedy Experiment. On January 9, 2004, the series moved back to Friday nights, in the 8:30PM timeslot. On September 17, 2004, the series moved back to the original 8:00PM timeslot, remaining there until the series finale in March 2006.

International 
In Canada, the series aired on YTV and later on Nickelodeon.

In Italy, the series aired under the name Le cose che amo di te (The things I Love about you) on Rai 2 from July 7, 2006 until August 2, 2008.

Streaming 
From January 2021 to January 2023, all four seasons of What I Like About You, began streaming on HBO Max.

Syndication 
From April to September 2006, reruns of What I Like About You aired as part of The WB’s Daytime WB weekday afternoon programming block alongside 8 Simple Rules. Reruns of the series moved to The CW (which replaced The WB) on September 18, 2006, airing for a full hour at 3:00PM on weekdays alongside Reba. On September 24, 2007, The CW reduced its daytime reruns of What I Like About You to one episode per day to accommodate the addition of reruns of All of Us, remaining until September 2008. Following the series' departure from The CW, the show began airing on ABC Family (now Freeform) in various timeslots during the daytime. The N aired the series in early 2009, a few months before their rebranding to TeenNick, where the series aired before subsequently being removed in 2013.

Home media
On May 1, 2007, Warner Home Video released the complete first season on DVD in region 1. The 3-disc set included a gag reel as the set's only bonus feature. Due to music licensing issues along, Lillix's cover of the theme song was removed and replaced with a generic pop-rock song produced specifically for the set. Due to low DVD sales and high music licensing costs, no further seasons were given a general retail release.

On March 7, 2017, Warner Archive released the complete second season on DVD in region 1. The 3-disc set is a Manufacture-on-Demand (MOD) release, available only from online sellers such as Amazon.com and their CreateSpace MOD program. Despite being a Manufacture-on-Demand release, the theme song is still replaced with the same song used for the season 1 DVD set, and although it was originally broadcast in widescreen high definition (the first season of the series to do so), the episodes are presented on the DVD in fullscreen format.

The complete third season was released on November 27, 2018. The complete fourth and final season was released on February 26, 2019.

Ratings

United States ratings

Awards and nominations
GLAAD Media Award

Teen Choice Awards

Young Artist Awards

References

External links

 
 

2000s American teen sitcoms
2002 American television series debuts
2006 American television series endings
English-language television shows
Television series about sisters
Television series about teenagers
Television series by Tollin/Robbins Productions
Television series by Warner Bros. Television Studios
Television series created by Dan Schneider
Television shows set in New York City
The WB original programming